Vanesa Levenaj (born 10 August 2001) is an Albanian footballer who plays as a midfielder for Vllaznia and the Albania women's national team.

Career
Levenaj, in addition to being capped for the Albania national team, has also made five appearances in the Champions League for Vllaznia.

See also
List of Albania women's international footballers

References

2001 births
Living people
Women's association football midfielders
Albanian women's footballers
Albania women's international footballers
KFF Vllaznia Shkodër players
Sportspeople from Fier